Myoleja tsaratanana is a species of tephritid, or fruit fly, in the genus Myoleja of the family Tephritidae.

References

tsaratanana